Vanoyia is a genus of flies in the family Stratiomyidae.

Species
Vanoyia tenuicornis (Macquart, 1834)

References

Stratiomyidae
Brachycera genera
Monotypic Brachycera genera
Taxa named by Joseph Villeneuve de Janti
Diptera of Europe